The Srinagar District is one of the 20 districts of the Indian union territory of Jammu and Kashmir. Situated in the centre of the Kashmir Valley, it is the second-most populous district of the union territory after Jammu District as per the 2011 national census, and is home to the summer capital city of Srinagar (with the city of Jammu serving as the territory's winter capital). Likewise, the city of Srinagar also serves as the Srinagar District's headquarters.

Administration
Srinagar district has 2 Sub-Divisions i.e. Srinagar West and Srinagar East.

7 Tehsils are: 
 Central Shalteng
 Chanapora/ Natipora
 Eidgah
 Khanyar
 Pantha chowk
 Srinagar North
 Srinagar South.

This district has 4 Blocks
 Harwan
 Qammerwari
 Khonmoh
 Srinagar

These blocks consist of a number of panchayats and villages.

Politics
Srinagar District has 1 parliamentary constituency i.e. Srinagar and 8 assembly constituencies:
 Hazratbal
 Zadibal
 Eidgah
 Khanyar
 Habba Kadal
 Amira Kadal
 Sonwar 
 Batmaloo

Demographics

According to the 2011 census Srinagar district has a population of 1,236,829, roughly equal to the nation of Estonia or the US state of New Hampshire. This gives it a ranking of 381st in India (out of a total of 640). Its population growth rate over the decade 2001–2011 was 20.35%. Srinagar has a sex ratio of 900 females for every 1,000 males (this varies with religion), and a literacy rate of 69.41%.

At the time of the 2011 census, 94.13% of the population spoke Kashmiri and 1.88% Urdu as their first language. Most kashmiris can speak urdu.

Weather

Places of worship
  Jamia Ahlehadees Markazi Masjid Madina Chowk Gow Kadal
 Hari Parbat
 Hazratbal Shrine
 Jamia Masjid, Srinagar, one of the oldest mosques in Kashmir
 Shah-i-Hamadan Mosque
 Shrine of Makhdoom Sahib
 Shankaracharya temple, possibly the oldest shrine in Kashmir

See also
List of colleges in Srinagar
List of schools in Srinagar

References

External links
 
 Greater Kashmir, daily English newspaper from Srinagar, Kashmir
 Soan Meeraas, A Kashmiri newspaper from Srinagar, Kashmir

 
Districts of Jammu and Kashmir
Minority Concentrated Districts in India